Red Canoe Credit Union is an American credit union headquartered in Longview, Washington.

Red Canoe Credit Union was founded as Weyerhaeuser Credit Union in 1937 at an organizational meeting held at a Weyerhaeuser mill. Wally Ohfls was the credit union's first chief executive officer and was succeeded by his wife, Esther Ohlfs, when he was deployed with the U.S. armed forces during World War II. The credit union's name was changed to Weyerhaeuser Employees' Credit Union in 1994 and, again, to Red Canoe Credit Union in 2006. In 2014 it merged with the smaller Cowlitz Credit Union.

As of 2018, the credit union had 10 branches in Washington and Oregon. It had assets that year of about $733 million, and more than 56,000 members.

See also
 Credit unions in the United States

References

1937 establishments in Washington (state)
Credit unions based in Washington (state)
Longview, Washington
Banks established in 1937